Tuitjenhorn (West Frisian: Tutinghorn) is a village in the Dutch province of North Holland. It is a part of the municipality of Schagen. Tuitjenhorn was the main village of the former Harenkarspel municipality. Tuitjenhorn lies about 9 km northwest of Heerhugowaard.

The village was first mentioned between 1280 and 1287 as "van tutinghehorne". The etymology is unclear. Tuitjenhorn is a dike village. The Catholic St Jacobus de Meerdere Church is a basilica-like church built between 1857 and 1859 and has been built around a tower from 1810.

Famous Tuitjenhorners
Gerard Kuiper, Dutch/American astronomer
Daniella van Graas, Dutch fashion model and actress
Celeste Plak, Dutch volleyball player
Femke Meines, Dutch singer

Gallery

References

Schagen
Populated places in North Holland